Division, (Division/Milwaukee in station announcements) is an 'L' station on the CTA's Blue Line. The station is located at the Polonia Triangle (the intersection of Milwaukee, Ashland, and Division) and serves the Wicker Park and East Ukrainian Village areas of West Town. From Division, trains take 6 minutes to reach downtown.

Bus connections 
CTA
 9 Ashland (Owl Service) 
 X9 Ashland Express (Weekday Rush Hours only) 
 56 Milwaukee
 70 Division

Notes and references

Notes

References

External links 

 Division/Milwaukee Station Page
Polish Triangle entrance from Google Maps Street View

CTA Blue Line stations
Railway stations in the United States opened in 1951